1997 World Ice Hockey Championships may refer to:
 1997 Men's World Ice Hockey Championships
 1997 IIHF Women's World Championship